Juma Masudi (born 30 August 1977 in Bujumbura) is a Burundian footballer who plays for Inter Star as a striker.

International career
He was member of both the Rwanda and Burundi national teams and played 3 games in the 1995 FIFA World Youth Championship in Qatar.

External links
 
 FIFA Profile

1977 births
Living people
Rwandan footballers
Rwanda international footballers
Burundian footballers
Burundi international footballers
Association football forwards
Sportspeople from Bujumbura
Burundian expatriate footballers
Burundian expatriate sportspeople in Rwanda
Expatriate footballers in Rwanda
Rayon Sports F.C. players
Expatriate football managers in Rwanda
Burundian football managers
Prince Louis FC players
Dual internationalists (football)